Jafar Ahmed Sadik, better known as Jaffar Byn or the initials JB (born 4 January 1996 in Rinkeby, Stockholm, Sweden) is a Somali rapper. He resides in Rinkeby. In 2017, he was sentenced to four years imprisonment for weapon crimes; he was released in October 2020 after serving three years of his sentence.

Discography

Studio albums

EPs
 Trilogin (2021)

Singles

Other charted songs

Notes

References

Living people
1997 births
Swedish rappers